La Granja is a district of the Palmares canton, in the Alajuela province of Costa Rica.

History 
La Granja was created on 14 December 1964 by Ley 3468. Segregated from Buenos Aires.

Geography 
La Granja has an area of  km² and an elevation of  metres.

Demographics 

For the 2011 census, La Granja had a population of  inhabitants.

Transportation

Road transportation 
The district is covered by the following road routes:
 National Route 1
 National Route 135
 National Route 169

References 

Districts of Alajuela Province
Populated places in Alajuela Province